Saint-Clair-sur-les-Monts is a commune in the Seine-Maritime department in the Normandy region in northern France.

Geography

Heraldry

Population

Places of interest

 The church of St.Clair, dating from the thirteenth century.
 A fifteenth century manorhouse.
 The 3 Châteaux (de Marseille, Mézerville and de Taillanville).
 A sixteenth-century stone cross.

See also
Communes of the Seine-Maritime department

References

Communes of Seine-Maritime